Lee Bentham (born July 27, 1970) is a Canadian former racing driver from Richmond Hill, Ontario. In 1990 and 1992 he competed in the Formula K karting World Championship series.  He moved to cars in the Toyota Atlantic series in 1995 in a successful partial-season program that managed to place Bentham on the podium twice and finished 8th in points.  The following year Bentham captured 7 podiums and was the series runner-up.  1997 was less successful as he only finished 5th in series points.  He also competed for Forsythe Racing in the Indy Lights series that season and won on the oval at Gateway International Raceway and finished 5th in points.  1998 was Bentham's breakout year as he captured three wins and seven podiums on his way to the Toyota Atlantic Championship for Forsythe Championship Racing.  1999 was his final year of top-level racing and was another year in Atlantics where he won a single race and finished 6th in points.  Since 2012, Bentham has been the Driver Development Coach for Ed Carpenter Racing in the IndyCar series, having previously coached Josef Newgarden.

External links
Driver Database Profile

1970 births
Living people
Atlantic Championship drivers
Indy Lights drivers
Racing drivers from Ontario
Sportspeople from Richmond Hill, Ontario

Forsythe Racing drivers